Marco André Azevedo Gonçalves (born 1 March 1978), known simply as Marco, is a Portuguese former professional footballer who played as a goalkeeper.

Club career
Marco was born in Amares, Braga District. During his professional career, other than modest clubs in his early years, he played for S.C. Braga (where he was consecutively barred by two Portuguese internationals, Quim and Paulo Santos, after the former's departure to S.L. Benfica), C.F. Os Belenenses, Gil Vicente FC, U.D. Oliveirense, F.C. Arouca and C.D. Trofense, the first two in the Primeira Liga and the last four in the Segunda Liga.

Marco made his debut in the Portuguese top flight on 17 February 2002, appearing for Braga in a 1–0 away loss against C.D. Santa Clara.

References

External links

1978 births
Living people
People from Amares
Sportspeople from Braga District
Portuguese footballers
Association football goalkeepers
Primeira Liga players
Liga Portugal 2 players
Segunda Divisão players
S.C. Braga players
S.C. Braga B players
C.F. Os Belenenses players
Gil Vicente F.C. players
U.D. Oliveirense players
F.C. Arouca players
S.C. Espinho players
C.D. Trofense players
Boavista F.C. players
AD Oliveirense players
Portuguese expatriate footballers
Expatriate footballers in Switzerland
Portuguese expatriate sportspeople in Switzerland